Whigham is a city in Grady County, Georgia, United States. The population was 471 at the 2010 census, down from 631 in 2000.

History
The community was named after Robert Whigham, a local merchant.

The Georgia General Assembly incorporated Whigham as a town in 1896. It was incorporated again as a city in 1970.

Geography

Whigham is located in western Grady County at  (30.884219, -84.324927). U.S. Route 84 passes through the center of town as Broad Avenue; it leads east  to Cairo, the county seat, and west  to Bainbridge.
Whigham is located halfway between Memphis, Tennessee, and Miami, Florida. 

Demographics

As of the census of 2000, there were 631 people, 179 households, and 134 families residing in the city. The racial makeup of the city was 61.01% White, 35.34% African American, 0.79% Native American, 2.06% from other races, and 0.79% from two or more races. Hispanic or Latino of any race were 2.54% of the population.

There were 179 households, out of which 37.4% had children under the age of 18 living with them, 55.3% were married couples living together, 15.6% had a female householder with no husband present, and 25.1% were non-families. 24.0% of all households were made up of individuals, and 12.8% had someone living alone who was 65 years of age or older.  The average household size was 2.78 and the average family size was 3.31.

In the city, the population was spread out, with 25.0% under the age of 18, 7.0% from 18 to 24, 18.7% from 25 to 44, 20.9% from 45 to 64, and 28.4% who were 65 years of age or older.  The median age was 44 years. For every 100 females, there were 79.3 males.  For every 100 females age 18 and over, there were 72.0 males.

The median income for a household in the city was $22,639, and the median income for a family was $26,042. Males had a median income of $22,813 versus $17,000 for females. The per capita income for the city was $11,103.  About 25.2% of families and 25.9% of the population were below the poverty line, including 42.9% of those under age 18 and 10.4% of those age 65 or over.

Education
Grady County School System operates area public schools. Whigham School, a K-8 school, is in Whigham. Cairo High School in Cairo serves Whigham.

Notable people
The electric blues guitarist, songwriter, and singer Johnnie Marshall was born in Whigham in 1961.

The Plath family, who have a show on TLC.

Ernest Riles, former infielder for the San Francisco Giants and Milwaukee Brewers lived here during his time with the Giants.

References

Cities in Georgia (U.S. state)
Cities in Grady County, Georgia